The Mine Foreman (German: Der Obersteiger) is a 1952 Austrian historical musical film directed by Franz Antel and starring Hans Holt, Josefin Kipper and Wolf Albach-Retty. It is set in the reign of Ludwig I of Bavaria. The film's sets were designed by Isabella and Werner Schlichting.

Cast
 Hans Holt as Max, Herzog von Bayern
 Josefin Kipper as Prinzessin Luise
 Wolf Albach-Retty as Andreas Spaun, ein Kavalier  
 Waltraut Haas as Nelly Lampl  
 Grethe Weiser as Clara Blankenfeld, Kammerfrau 
 Gunther Philipp as Medardus von Krieglstein, Adjutant  
 Oskar Sima as Matthieas Lampl, Löwenwirt in Hallstatt  
 Annie Rosar as Stasi, Kellnerin  
 Theodor Danegger as Hofkammeradjunkt Pötzl  
 Helene Lauterböck as Gräfin Amalie von Sensheim  
 Rudolf Carl as Obersteiger aus Berchtesgaden  
 Joseph Egger as Praxmarer, Obersteiger aus Hallstatt  
 Raoul Retzer as Blasius, Hausdiener  
 Walter Janssen as König Ludwig I. von Bayern

References

Bibliography 
 Robert Dassanowsky. Austrian Cinema: A History. McFarland, 2005.

External links 
 

1952 films
1950s historical musical films
Austrian historical musical films
1950s German-language films
Films directed by Franz Antel
Films set in Bavaria
Films set in the Alps
Films set in the 1820s
Operetta films
Films based on operettas
Films scored by Hans Lang
Austrian black-and-white films